Bibliothèque des Écoles françaises d'Athènes et de Rome ("Library of the French schools of Greece and Rome") is the name of two published series of historical documents, such as the letters of 13th century Popes during the Crusades.

Modern history books which cite excerpts from letters of the Crusades, often list the BEF in their citation.

The first series began publication in 1877.

The second series was published 1884–1960.

Selected publications

First series
 Le liber censuum de l'Église romaine
 Sainte Catherine de Sienne: essai de critique des sources

Second series
 Les Registres d'Innocent IV (ed. Élie Berger, 4 vols., Paris, 1884–1921)
 Les Registres d'Alexandre IV (ed. C. Bourel de la Roncière, J. de Loye, P. de Cenival, and A. Coulon, 3 vols., Paris, 1902–1953)
 Les Registres d'Urbain IV (ed. Jean Guiraud, 4 vols., Paris, 1899–1929)
 Les Registres de Clément IV (ed. Edouard Jordan, 6 fasc., Paris, 1893–1945)
 Les Registres de Grégoire X et de Jean XXI (ed. Jean Guiraud and L. Cadier, 4 fasc., Paris, 1892–1906)
 Les Registres de Nicolas III (ed. Jules Gay [and Suzanne Vitte], fasc., Paris, 1898–1938)
 Les Registres de Martin IV (ed. F. Olivier-Martin et al., 3 fasc., Paris, 1901–1935)
 Les Registres d'Honorius IV (ed. Maurice Prou, Paris, 1886–1888)
 Les Registres de Nicolas IV (ed. Ernest Langlois, 9 fasc., Paris, 1886–1893)

Other correspondence includes that of:
 Innocent III, edited by Migne, P.L., vols. 214-16
 Honorius IV, Regesta, edited by Pressutti
 Gregory IX, Registres, Auvray

See also
 Victorian societies for text publication
 French School at Athens

Notes

References
 https://web.archive.org/web/20080320001633/http://www.premontre.org/subpages/loci/monasticon/generalia/3%20tomus.htm#Elenchus%20Materiae
 http://www.british-history.ac.uk/report.aspx?compid=33798
 http://digicoll.library.wisc.edu/cgi-bin/History/History-idx?type=turn&entity=History.CrusTwo.p0585&isize=text
 https://web.archive.org/web/20110527163236/http://monasticmatrix.usc.edu/bibliographia/?function=detail&id=9624&PHPSESSID=32f


Documents
Academic publishing
13th-century popes
+